Maram Ben Aziza (born December 25, 1986), is a Tunisian actor, model, and entrepreneur, best known for her role of Selima in the Tunisian series Maktoub.

Biography 
Maram Ben Aziza born on December 25, 1986, in Carthage, Tunisia. she has been passionate about dance and fashion from a very young age. She started a modeling career since 2000, she did represent several beauty brands and posed for some magazine covers. She started her acting career after her successful appearance in the Tunisian series Maktoub in 2009.

In 2011 Maram starred in the Tunisian film Histoires tunisiennes by Nada Mezni Hafaiedh, later on she acted in multiple films and television series. She also works as a host and columnist in television lately.

The actress quickly became an instagram influencer, with more than 2 million followers as of 2019.

Founder of a fancy clothes and accessories store, Maramode, she also owns a restaurant, Omek Houria in Tunis.

Personal life 
Maram married in 2018

Filmography

Film 
 2006: Rue Tanit (Tanit Street) by Fayçal Bouzayen Chemmami
 2011: Histoires tunisiennes (Tunisian Stories) by Nada Mezni Hafaiedh: As Sabrine
 2011: Black Gold by Jean-Jacques Annaud
 2011: Sauve qui peut (Every Man for Himself) (Short film) by Fethi Doghri
 2014: My China Doll by Rachid Ferchiou
 2015: Lan Taadilou (You Won't Be Fair) by Atef Ben Hassine

Television

Series 
 2009 – 2014: Maktoub (Destiny) (seasons 2–4) by Sami Fehri: As Selima
 2010: Nsibti Laaziza (My Beloved Mother in Law) (season 1) by Slaheddine Essid
 2012: Omar by Hatem Ali: as wife of Yazdegerd III (Maria)
 2013: Allô Maa (Hello Mom) by Kaïs Chekir: as Maram Ben Aziza
 2013: Happy Ness (season 1) by Majdi Smiri: as Maram
 2015: School (season 2) by Rania Gabsi & Sofien Letaiem: as Folla
 2015: Lilet Chak (The Doubt Night) by Majdi Smiri: as Lilia
 2015: Histoires Tunisiennes (Tunisian Stories) by Nada Mezni Hafaiedh: as Sabrine 
 2016: Al Akaber (The Aristocratic) by Madih Belaïd: as Mariem
 2016: Samarkand by Eyad Al Khzuz
 2017: Awled Moufida (Moufida's Sons) (season 3) by Sami Fehri: as Nour / Seddik's Secret Daughter / Seddik's Assistant
 2017: Lemnara (The Lighthouse) by Atef Ben Hassine: as Maram Ben Aziza
 2018: Lavage (Washing) by Saif Dhrif: as Racha Ben Said
 2018: Elli Lik Lik by Kaïs Chekir: as Narjes
 2021: Ouled El Ghoul by Mourad Ben Cheikh: as Jamila / Jiji

Tv shows 
 2011: Khallik Fashion on Tunisna TV: Tv Presenter
 2013: Dhouk Tohsel of Kaouther Belhaj on Tunisna TV: Guest of Episode 4
 2013: Taxi on Ettounsiya TV: Guest of Episode 5
 2013: Startime on Tunisna TV: Guest of Episode 32
 2013: Fo Casting on Tunisna TV: Guest of Episode 2
 2013: Labès (We Are Fine) on Attessia TV with Naoufel Ouertani: Guest of Episode 2
 2014: Braquage on Jawhara FM: Guest
 2015: Ettayara (The Plane) on Attessia TV: Guest 4
 2016: Tahadi El Chef (The Chef Challenge) on M Tunisia: Guest of Episode 20
 2016: Tendance+ on Attessia TV: TV Presenter
 2016: Romdhane Show on Mosaique FM: Guest
 2017: Abdelli Showtime with Lotfi Abdelli on Attessia TV: Guest of Episode 7 PART 2 of Season 4
 2017: Labès with Naoufel Ouertani on Attessia TV: Guest of Episode 1 of Season 7
 2017: Labès with Naoufel Ouertani on Attessia TV: Guest of Episode 32 of Season 7
 2017: Dbara w Ziara: Guest of Episode 2
 2018: Klem Ennes (Invitée De L'Episode 20 De La Saison 6)
 2018: Abdelli Showtime with Lotfi Abdelli: Guest of Episode 2 (Part 3) of Season 5
 2019: Bas Les Masques (Down The Masks) with Amine Gara on El Hiwar Ettounsi: Guest of Episode 13 of Season 1
 2019: Eli Baadou (Afterword) on El Hiwar El Tounsi
 2019: 90 Minutes on El Hiwar El Ttounsi with Hédi Zaiem: Guest of Episode 14 of Season 1
 2019: Fekret Sami Fehri (The Idea of Sami Fehri) on El Hiwar El Tounsi: Guest of Part 2 of Episode 3 of Season 2
 2019: 360° of Hédi Zaiem on El Hiwar Ettounsi
 2019: Dimanche Tout Est Permis (Sunday Everything Is Permitted) of Nidhal Saâdi: Guest of Episode 19 Partie 3 of Season 2
 2019 – 2020: Eli Baadou (Epilogue) on El Hiwar El Tounsi: Chronicler
 2020: Fekret Sami Fehri (The Idea of Sami Fehri) (Season 2) with Hédi Zaiem on El Hiwar Ettounsi: Episode 21 of Season 2
 2020: 5ème Arbitre 
 2020: Hkeyet Tounsia with Sonia Dahmani (Episode 31 of Season 3 Part 1)
 2020: Sahri Bahri: Guest of Episode 2
 2021: Dari Darek (web show) of Amel Smaoui on YouTube Channel of Radio IFM: Guest of Episode 9
 2021: Dbara w Ziara: Guest of Episode 13 of Season 1

Videos
 2014: Maram Ben Aziza: Je n'ai aucun Problème avec Hannibal TV (Maram Ben Aziza: I don't have a problem with Hannibal TV)
 2014: Interview Maram ben Aziza By BF Magazine
 2016: Interview Maram Ben Aziza by Focus Optique: Muse Michael Kors Tunisie
 2016: Anniversary Surprise Maram Ben Aziza au Tunnel
 2016: WEPOST Chrono: Maram Ben Aziza
 2016: Maram Ben Aziza avec Shinyman.com: Maram Ben Aziza New Muse of Samsung Tunisia
 2016: Maram Ben Aziza describes the critical humanitary situation in Aïn Draham
 2017: Maram Ben Aziza on Shems FM: My Role in the TV serial "Akaber" is different
 2018: Maram Ben Aziza responds to her critics...
 2020: Maram Ben Aziza: How Much Money Do You Earn from Instagram and TV?
 2020: Maram Ben Aziza, The Interview by Faza.tn
 2021: ''Maram Ben Aziza Corona Virus Rationnement? Tunisie

References

External links
 
 

Living people
Tunisian television actresses
1986 births
Tunisian film actresses
Tunisian female models
People from Tunis